William Levi Davies (15 February 1883 – 23 July 1959) was an Australian rules footballer who played for Essendon in the Victorian Football League (VFL).

Davies started out at Williamstown in the Victorian Football Association after coming to Melbourne from Yea. He played for Williamstown from 1901 to 1905 and again in 1910–11, totalling 89 games and kicking 3 goals. He won a trophy for equal best attendance at training in 1901.

He debuted at Essendon in 1906 and was a wingman in their losing 1908 VFL Grand Final side. Davies also represented the league at interstate football during his time with Essendon.

Later an umpire, Davies officiated in two 1914 VFL season matches.

References

Holmesby, Russell and Main, Jim (2007). The Encyclopedia of AFL Footballers. 7th ed. Melbourne: Bas Publishing.
Essendon Football Club profile

1883 births
Australian rules footballers from Bendigo
Essendon Football Club players
Williamstown Football Club players
Australian Football League umpires
1959 deaths